Disney International HD is an Indian pay television owned by The Walt Disney Company India. a wholly owned by The Walt Disney Company. It is Disney India's first channel to be broadcast in high-definition and broadcast in a 16:9 aspect ratio. The channel primary airs Disney American originals.
 
The channel is primarily funded by subscriptions with secondary revenue from advertising and is targeted to the 14-25 years age group while the other Disney networks broadcast in the area are aimed towards a 2-14 age group audience.

History
In April 2016, Disney Channel India dropped live-action programming to focus more on local animation, as those shows drove better ratings. 
 
Disney Broadcasting India had made a license application for Disney International HD on 17 March 2017 with the Ministry of Information & Broadcasting (MIB). MIB approved the license on September 1, 2017, to take over from Bindass Play with Bindass Play programming shifting over to Bindass. The channel was launched on 29 October 2017. 10 of the 30 available TV series were on the channel at launch.
 
During the channel's first few weeks of broadcast, it didn't show any commercials.
 
Disney International HD shows an exclusive (as it has not been syndicated elsewhere) library of over 1500 or more episodes coming from 30 live action series. The channel also airs 100+ Disney movies selected for the targeted ages of 14 to 25 years old.

On 15 August 2021, coinciding the Indian Independence Day, Disney Channel original movie Spin premiered on Disney International HD, two days after its release.

Programming 
 Austin & Ally
 Dog with a Blog
 Girl Meets World
 Hannah Montana
 K.C. Undercover
 Kickin' It
 Kirby Buckets
 Lab Rats
 Liv and Maddie
 Wizards of Waverly Place

References

External links
 
 

Television channels and stations established in 2017
Television stations in Mumbai
Disney India Media Networks
English-language television stations in India
Disney Star